Brighton was a non-metropolitan district in East Sussex, England. It was abolished on 1 April 1997 and replaced by Brighton and Hove.

Political control
From the first election to the council in 1973 until its abolition in 1997 political control of the council was held by the following parties:

Leadership
The last leader of the council, Steve Bassam, who had led the council from 1987, went on to be the first leader of the replacement authority, Brighton and Hove City Council.

Council elections
Elections from 1973 to 1983 were for the whole council.  Following the 1983 election, one-third of the council (one seat in each of the 16 three-member wards) was up for election each year, other than county council election years.  There was no election in 1996: the councillors due for election in that year had their term of office extended up to the end of the borough council in April 1997.
1973 Brighton Borough Council election
1976 Brighton Borough Council election
1979 Brighton Borough Council election
1983 Brighton Borough Council election (New ward boundaries)
1984 Brighton Borough Council election
1986 Brighton Borough Council election
1987 Brighton Borough Council election
1988 Brighton Borough Council election
1990 Brighton Borough Council election
1991 Brighton Borough Council election
1992 Brighton Borough Council election
1994 Brighton Borough Council election 
1995 Brighton Borough Council election

Borough result maps

By-election results

References

External links

 
Brighton
Council elections in East Sussex
District council elections in England